Rvy is the name of several rural localities in Russia:
Rvy, Pskov Oblast, a village in Dnovsky District of Pskov Oblast
Rvy, Tula Oblast, a village in Rassvetovsky Rural Okrug of Leninsky District of Tula Oblast